Gecinulus is a genus of birds in the woodpecker family Picidae. The species are found in South and Southeast Asia.

Taxonomy
The genus Gecinulus was introduced by the English zoologist Edward Blyth in 1840 to accommodate the pale-headed woodpecker (Gecinulus grantia). The genus name is a diminutive of the genus name Gecinus which had been introduced by the German ornithologist Friedrich Boie in 1831. Gecinus combines the Classical Greek gē meaning "earth" or "ground" with kineō meaning "to move".

The genus contains three species:

References

 
Bird genera
 
Taxa named by Edward Blyth
Taxonomy articles created by Polbot